"SOS" is a song Rihanna included in her second studio album, A Girl like Me (2006). It was released on February 14, 2006 through Def Jam Recordings as the lead single of the album. "SOS" was written by J. R. Rotem and E. Kidd Bogart, with additional credit assigned to Ed Cobb for inspiration built around a sample of Soft Cell's 1981 recording of "Tainted Love". This song was written by Cobb in 1965, later influencing the creation of "SOS". Production of the  dance and dance-pop song was handled by Rotem. Critical reception of "SOS" was generally positive, with the majority of music critics praising the inclusion of the "Tainted Love" sample. Some critics compared "SOS" to Rihanna's debut single, "Pon de Replay".

"SOS" became a commercial success. In the United States, it topped the Billboard Hot 100 chart for three consecutive weeks, becoming Rihanna's first number one single on the chart. "SOS" peaked at number one on the US Hot Dance Club Songs chart and Mainstream Top 40 chart. "SOS" was certified triple platinum by the Recording Industry Association of America (RIAA) for sales and streams of 3,000,000 units. The song was also successful in Europe as well as Australia, where it spent eight consecutive weeks at number one.

Three music videos were shot for "SOS"; aside from the official music video, directed by Chris Applebaum, promotional campaign videos were shot for lingerie brand Agent Provocateur and Nike. "SOS" was performed live at the 2006 MTV EMA awards in Copenhagen, Denmark. "SOS" was included on the set list of the Good Girl Gone Bad Tour (2007–09) and the Last Girl on Earth (2010–11), which saw Rihanna perform a rock-tinged version of the song.

Background and conception

"SOS" was written by J. R. Rotem and Evan "Kidd" Bogart, with production helmed by Rotem. The song was recorded at Bartmitzvah Hall Studios, Century City, California, and Loft Recording Studios, Bronxville, New York, after which it was mixed by Phil Tan at Silent Sound Studios in Atlanta. "SOS" contains a sample of "Tainted Love", written by Ed Cobb in 1964, and popularized by English synthpop duo Soft Cell in 1981. Cobb was assigned a writing credit because of the sample. In an interview with HitQuarters, Rotem explained the song's conception, saying "I heard 'Tainted Love' and wanted to take the bass line and update it with a new swing. When I gave the track to Evan Bogart, the '80s feeling was already in the track." Rotem was asked how he felt about working with singers who became successful international recording artists after he had worked with them in an interview with William E. Ketchum for HipHopDX in May 2011, and referred to Rihanna and writing "SOS" in his response, saying:

"SOS" was originally intended to be given to and recorded by former Def Jam labelmate Christina Milian, for her third studio album, So Amazin' (2006), but Milian passed on it and former Def Jam CEO and chairman L.A. Reid offered the song to Rihanna instead.

Production and mixing
The background vocals in the song were compressed using a compressor program called Waves Renaissance Compressor, which was used in order to create an enhanced polished effect. In an interview with Sound on Sound, mixing engineer Phil Tan, who carried out the audio mixing on "SOS", explained that he compressed the background vocals because "SOS" is a "high energy track", and he wanted the vocals to complement it. Tan also noted that the background vocals were pitch shifted to increase tonal quality and create an enhanced effect during the chorus. The pitch shifting consisted of making the left vocals flat and the right vocals sharp, with varying degrees of delay, and later mixing them together. When asked about the production of the lead vocals, Tan described the song as "a pounding type of song, and the lyrics are a cry for help, so the vocals need to be 'in your face', almost aggressive," and said that he wanted the vocals to remain constant. As with the background vocals, the lead vocals were compressed using the Waves Renaissance Compressor. Tan continued to note that the lack of reverb included on "SOS" was largely due to the fact that being an uptempo dance-pop song, there was not a lot of room left to add anything else. Tan explained the production process of sampling "Tainted Love", as well as the changes which were made:

Composition

"SOS" is an up-tempo dance and dance-pop song. The song includes synth riffs and machine beats as part of its instrumental. The lyrical content of the song is based around the theme of a "boy meets girl" scenario; Quentin B. Huff of Popmatters provided a synopsis of the lyrical content, writing that "SOS" is a "classic tale of girl-sees-boy, girl-falls-head-over-heels, girl-dreams-of-boy-so-much-she-loses-herself, girl-sings-catchy-pop-song-about-boy, girl-sells-lots-of-records". The song's instrumental composition is built around a prominent sample of "Tainted Love", which was originally written by Ed Cobb in 1965 and popularised by English synthpop duo Soft Cell, when they released their cover version in 1981.

The use of the 'Tainted Love' sample was well received by critics. Ruth Jamieson of The Observer commented that the sample was an "outrageously hooky Soft Cell rhythm". Jazzily Bass of Contactmusic.com complimented the inclusion of the "Tainted Love" sample, describing "SOS" as "superbly infectious". Bass continued to praise the song for not making the sample too obvious, writing "I was accepting it to sound like every other song that has sampled the hook." Kelefa Sanneh of The New York Times described the inclusion the "Tainted Love" sample as being "brazen" and "astute".

Release
"SOS" was first released in France on March 27, 2006, as a physical maxi single. The maxi single included both the radio edit and instrumental versions of "SOS", as well as the album track "Break It Off", which features Jamaican reggae singer Sean Paul. In Australia, the song was released to download digitally through the iTunes Store on April 3, 2006, with non-single track "Let Me" featuring as the B-side. In the United States, "SOS" was released on April 11, 2006, as a CD single. In Germany, the song was released on April 15, 2006, also as a physical maxi single. The package consisted of the radio edit and instrumental versions of "SOS" and "Break It Off", in addition to the music video for "SOS". In the United Kingdom, "SOS" was released on April 17, 2006, as a CD single.

Critical reception
Upon the release of the album, "SOS" garnered positive reviews from music critics. Bill Lamb of About.com praised the sampling of Cobb's "Tainted Love" and Rihanna's vocal performance, with specific regard to her lower register. However, Lamb criticized Rihanna for not displaying any sense of originality. Additionally, Lamb compared Rihanna's vocal performance in the song to Beyoncé, writing "The echoes of Beyonce in the higher register are weaker." Sal Cinquemani of Slant Magazine praised the sample and noted that "SOS" rivals Rihanna's debut single "Pon de Replay" (Music of the Sun, 2005). Despite praising "SOS", Cinquemani continued to write that it was the only song on A Girl Like Me which displayed a high level of "audacity". David Jeffries of AllMusic described "SOS" as a "sexy club tune".

Quentin B. Huff of Popmatters was complimentary of the song, writing, "all things considered, '[SOS]' is a decent song, brimming with energy and perfectly suited to Rihanna’s layered vocals." Barry Walters of Rolling Stone wrote, "Barbados-born emigre Rihanna's huge dancehall pop hit last year, "Pon De Replay," was savvy and sexy, and her new smash, "SOS," is even more so. Singing a snaky Destiny's Child-like melody around synth riffs and machine beats from Soft Cell's '80s classic hit "Tainted Love," Rihanna proves America still appreciates clever pop when it hears it."

Year-end lists

Chart performance

In the United States, "SOS" peaked at number one on the Billboard Hot 100 chart in the chart issue dated May 13, 2006, leaping 33 positions from the previous week, and became the singer's first number one single on the Hot 100. "SOS" experienced a surge in sales the week prior to reaching the summit of the chart, due to Def Jam holding off of releasing the song to digital outlets before the release of A Girl like Me. The song displaced Daniel Powter"s "Bad Day", which had spent the previous five weeks atop the chart, from number one. "SOS" stayed atop the Hot 100 for a further two weeks, spending three consecutive weeks at number one. "SOS" also peaked at number one on the US Hot Dance Club Songs and Pop Songs charts. The song also peaked at number seven on the Radio Songs chart and peaked at number 40 on the Adult Contemporary chart. On March 12, 2021, "SOS" was certified triple platinum by the Recording Industry Association of America (RIAA).

In Europe, "SOS" achieved moderate chart success in different countries. In Belgium (Flanders),  the song debuted at number 18 on April 22, 2006, and peaked at number two in its fourth week charting. In Switzerland, "SOS" debuted and peaked at number three on May 21, 2006, and stayed inside the top-ten of that countries singles chart for the following nine weeks. In Finland, the song spent two weeks on the countries singles chart; "SOS" debuted and peaked at number two on April 24, 2006, and fell to number 14 to following week. In Norway, "SOS" debuted at number 16 on April 17, 2006, and peaked at number three in its third week charting. Elsewhere, the song attained top-five positions on the singles charts of Austria and Belgium (Wallonia), peaking at numbers four and five, respectively. " SOS" attained top-ten positions in The Netherlands and Italy, peaking at numbers six and seven, respectively. The song failed to chart within the top-ten in France and Sweden, peaking at number 12 on both countries singles charts.

In the United Kingdom, "SOS" debuted at number five on April 22, 2006. The following week, the song rose to number two, being held off of the number one position by Gnarls Barkley's "Crazy". In its third week charting, both "SOS" and "Crazy" retained their respective chart positions. Over the following weeks, "SOS" began to come down the top 10 of the chart, falling to number five for two weeks, whilst "Crazy" retained its number one position. In Australia, "SOS" debuted at number one on April 30, 2006, a position it held for eight consecutive weeks. In New Zealand, the song debuted at number 37 on April 10, 2006, and spent the following five weeks fluctuating in the lower region of the top 40 singles. In its seventh week charting, the song leaped to a peak of number three for two weeks.

Music videos

"SOS" received two separate treatments for the music video, each serving a different purpose. In addition to the official music video, another version was shot for a Nike campaign. The official music video and Nike versions were directed by Chris Applebaum, who later directed the music video for "Umbrella" (Good Girl Gone Bad, 2007). These videos was edited by Nabil Mechi from Murex, who later edit the music videos for "Umbrella" and "Rockstar 101".

Official music video
The video begins with Rihanna singing the hook while wearing a low-cut green dress and dancing in front of tropical trees on an island. Key lighting is used to place emphasis on Rihanna, whilst the backdrop remains virtually dark and invisible. For the first verse, Rihanna is featured dancing against a plain grey background, wearing a white top and sequined silver miniskirt, whilst flirtatiously dancing with the male dancer. Halfway through the verse, another scene is introduced, with Rihanna wearing a pink dress in a mirrored room, showing multiple reflections of the singer from different angles. For the first chorus, Rihanna is mainly featured wearing the green dress on the island, but a new scene of Rihanna wearing a midriff-baring black lace is introduced toward the end of the chorus, where she, as well as four male dancers, perform a choreographed dance routine. Scenes of Rihanna in the mirrored room are intercut with the previous scene for the duration of the chorus. For the second verse, a further scene of Rihanna is depicted, this time featuring the scenes performing a dance routine with a three female dancers, in the same setting as the one at the beginning of the video. For the second chorus, another scene of the singer sitting on a chair whilst listening to music is shown. For the remainder of the video, including the bridge and last chorus, all scenes featured in the video are intercut with one another, displaying a total of five different scenes and settings.

Nike version
The video begins with a long shot of a group of dancers who have just finished rehearsing a dance routine. As the dancers walk out of view, Rihanna walks onto the middle of the floor, where the singer turns, and faces the camera, and closes her eyes. Standing still, Rihanna begins to snap her fingers, whereby the screen begins to cut between a scene of Rihanna, who is noticeably in a different setting, and black fades. As the music begins to play, it becomes apparent that the setting has changed from a rehearsal studio into a nightclub, which Rihanna in the center. The scene is fairly dark with different colored lights projected into different areas of the nightclub, as dancers infiltrate the dance floor surrounding Rihanna. This scene is used for the first verse-chorus-verse part of the song, but changes to a scene of Rihanna, accompanied by several dancers, situated in a gym locker room for the second chorus. For the bridge, the scene changes back to Rihanna in the nightclub, but this time in a different change of outfit. This scene is used for the last chorus. The video ends with a close-up of Rihanna in the nightclub standing still as the audio finishes, where she closes her eyes, which prompts the scene to change back to Rihanna in the middle of the rehearsal studio from the beginning of the video, to which she walks out of view of the camera.

Track listings

 Australian and European CD single
 "SOS" (radio edit) — 4:01
 "Let Me" (album version) — 3:56

 UK CD single
 "SOS" (album version) — 3:59
 "SOS" (Nevins Glam Club Mix) — 7:43

 CD maxi single
 "SOS" (radio edit) — 4:01
 "SOS" (instrumental) — 4:01
 "Break It Off" featuring Sean Paul — 3:33
 "SOS" (Video)

 European 12-inch vinyl
 "SOS" (radio edit) — 4:01
 "SOS" (instrumental) — 4:01
 "SOS" (Nevins Electrotek club mix)

 US 12-inch vinyl
 "SOS" (album version) — 3:59
 "SOS" (instrumental) — 4:01

Credits and personnel
Credits are adapted from the liner notes of A Girl Like Me, Def Jam Recordings, SRP Records.

Recording and sample
 Recorded at Bartmitzvah Hall Studios in Century City, and Loft Recording Studios in Bronxville.
 Mixed at Silent Sound Studios in Atlanta.
 Contains elements from the composition "Tainted Love", written by Ed Cobb under Embassy Music Corporation (BMI).

Personnel
 Songwriting – J. R. Rotem, Evan "Kidd" Bogart, Ed Cobb
 Production – J. R. Rotem
 Recording – J. R. Rotem, Al Hemberger
 Mixing – Phil Tan
 Assistant mixing engineer – Rob Skipworth
 Vocal production – Evan Rogers, Carl Sturken
 Lead and background vocals – Rihanna, Evan Rogers

Accolades

Charts

Weekly charts

Year-end charts

Certifications

|-

Release history

See also
 List of Billboard Hot 100 number ones of 2006
 List of Billboard Hot Dance Club Play number ones of 2006

References

2006 singles
Rihanna songs
Billboard Hot 100 number-one singles
Number-one singles in Australia
European Hot 100 Singles number-one singles
2006 songs
Music videos directed by Chris Applebaum
Song recordings produced by J. R. Rotem
Songs written by Ed Cobb
Songs written by J. R. Rotem
Songs written by E. Kidd Bogart
Dance-pop songs
Def Jam Recordings singles